Fred Earl Gladding (June 28, 1936 – May 21, 2015) was an American professional baseball player and coach. He was a right-handed pitcher over all or parts of 13 seasons (1961–1973) with the Detroit Tigers and Houston Astros. He was born in Flat Rock, Michigan, and attended Flat Rock Community High School.

For his career, he compiled a 48–34 record and 109 saves in 450 appearances, all but one as a relief pitcher, with a 3.13 earned run average and 394 strikeouts in 601 innings pitched. Gladding led the National League in saves with Houston in 1969, the first season the statistic was recognized.

In seven seasons with the Tigers, Gladding compiled a record of 26–11 and a 2.70 ERA in 217 games.  His .703 winning percentage with the Tigers is the highest in the franchise's history for a pitcher appearing in at least 200 games for the team. He returned to Detroit in 1976 as pitching coach and served three seasons on the staff of manager Ralph Houk.

Gladding also has the distinction of having the lowest non-zero lifetime batting average in major league history. For his career he batted .016  (1 for 63).

Gladding died May 21, 2015, in Columbia, South Carolina.

See also
 Best pitching seasons by a Detroit Tiger 
 Houston Astros award winners and league leaders
 List of Major League Baseball annual saves leaders

References

External links

1936 births
2015 deaths
Augusta Tigers players
Baseball players from Michigan
Birmingham Barons players
Charleston Senators players
Denver Bears players
Detroit Tigers coaches
Detroit Tigers players
Houston Astros players
Knoxville Smokies players
Major League Baseball pitchers
Major League Baseball pitching coaches
National League saves champions
People from Flat Rock, Michigan
Syracuse Chiefs players
Valdosta Tigers players